Stephen Eagleton (born 26 October 1976) is a retired Australian footballer.

Biography
He had previous NSL experience with Sydney United, Parramatta Power and Newcastle United. He was released by the Newcastle Jets after the 2006–07 season, but was resigned before the start of the 2007–08 season. His season was cut short by injury, though he joined his teammates on the victory dias when the Jets won the 2007–08 A-League Championship. He subsequently retired from professional football. Currently coaches the Central Coast Mariners Academy under 11 team.

External links
 Newcastle Jets profile
 Oz Football profile

1976 births
Living people
Soccer players from Sydney
A-League Men players
National Soccer League (Australia) players
Bankstown City FC players
Newcastle Jets FC players
Sydney Olympic FC players
Sydney United 58 FC players
Parramatta Power players
Association football fullbacks
Australian soccer players